Everton Football Club is a former football club from Port of Spain, Trinidad and Tobago.

Honours

Port of Spain Football League
Winners: 1930, 1931, 1932

Trinidad and Tobago Cup
Winners: 1929, 1930, 1931, 1932

References

Football clubs in Trinidad and Tobago